Verkhnetagirovo (Ürge Tahir) is a rural locality (a village) in Temyasovsky Selsoviet, Baymaksky District, Bashkortostan, Russia. The population was 99 as of 2010. There are 2 streets.

Geography 
Verkhnetagirovo is located 63 km north of Baymak (the district's administrative centre) by road. Nizhnetagirovo is the nearest rural locality.

References 

Rural localities in Baymaksky District